The Cleveland Cavaliers are currently heard on the radio via the Cavaliers AudioVerse, with flagship stations WTAM and WMMS. Spanish-language broadcasts are heard over Lorain, Ohio, station WNZN. Tim Alcorn and former Cavalier Jim Chones comprise the announcing team, with Mike Snyder as the in-studio/pre-game/post-game host, the latter duties shared with Cleveland native and former NBA player Brad Sellers. Rafael Hernandez Brito announces the Spanish-language broadcasts.

Televised game coverage airs on Bally Sports Ohio; John Michael handles television play-by-play duties, a rotation of former Cavalier players Austin Carr and Brad Daugherty and former Cavs coach Mike Fratello as color commentator, and Serena Winters as sideline reporter. From 2006–07 until 2018–19, five games produced by the regional sports network were simulcast over WUAB (channel 43); prior to this, WUAB was the over-the-air home for the team continuously beginning with the 1994–95 season.

Years are listed in descending order. Gold shading indicates championship season.

Television

Radio

Notes

References

See also 
 List of current National Basketball Association broadcasters

Cleveland Cavaliers
 
Broadcasters
SportsChannel
Fox Sports Networks
Bally Sports